Alexei Ivanovich Kostrikin (12 February 1929 – 22 September 2000) was a Russian mathematician, specializing in algebra and algebraic geometry.

Life
Kostrikin graduated from the Faculty of Mechanics and Mathematics at Moscow State University in 1952. In 1960, he earned a Doctor of Sciences degree under Igor Shafarevich at the Steklov Institute of Mathematics with a thesis on the Burnside problem. He became a faculty member at Moscow State University in 1963 and became a professor at the same university in 1976. In 1998, he became Honoured Professor of Moscow State University.

Prizes
Kostrikin was awarded the USSR State Prize in 1968 for his research on finite groups and Lie algebras and was elected the corresponding member of the USSR Academy of Sciences in 1976.

Books
Alexei Kostrikin published many scientific articles, books and textbooks, including a university textbook about algebra Introduction to algebra, translated into English and other languages.

Selected publications
Around Burnside, Springer Verlag 1990 2012 pbk reprint
with Pham Huu Tiep: Orthogonal Decompositions and Integral Lattices, de Gruyter 1994
with Yuri Manin: Linear algebra and geometry, Gordon and Breach 1989; 1997 pbk edition
Introduction to Algebra, Springer Verlag 1982 (Russian original 1977)
Exercises in algebra: a collection of exercises in algebra, linear algebra and geometry, Gordon and Breach 1996

Further reading
V. A. Artamonov, Yu. A .Bahturin, I. A. Chubarov, et al., Dedication: Alexei Ivanovich Kostrikin, Comm. Algebra 29 (9) (2001), ix–xiv.
Preface: On the 70th birthday of Alexei Ivanovich Kostrikin, J. Math. Sci. (New York) 93 (6) (1999), 801–808.
E. B. Vinberg, E. S. Golod, E. I. Zelmanov, et al., Aleksei Ivanovich Kostrikin [1929–2000] (Russian), Uspekhi Mat. Nauk 56 3(339) (2001), 143–145.
E. B. Vinberg, E. S. Golod, E. I. Zelmanov, et al., Aleksei Ivanovich Kostrikin [1929–2000], Russian Math. Surveys 56 (3) (2001), 559–561.

References

External links

1929 births
2000 deaths
20th-century Russian mathematicians
Soviet mathematicians
Algebraists
Algebraic geometers
Corresponding Members of the Russian Academy of Sciences
Moscow State University alumni
Recipients of the USSR State Prize